Haloragales is an order of flowering plants. In the Cronquist system of classification of 1981, it was placed in subclass Rosidae and had this circumscription:

 order Haloragales
 family Haloragaceae (this includes water milfoil)
 family Gunneraceae

References

Historically recognized angiosperm orders